Tom Pettit (24 July 1885 – 8 June 1970) was an Australian rules footballer who played with South Melbourne in the Victorian Football League (VFL).

Notes

External links 

1885 births
1970 deaths
Australian rules footballers from Melbourne
Sydney Swans players
People from Brunswick, Victoria